The Way of All Flesh is a 1903 novel by Samuel Butler. 
The title derives from the expression "I am going the way of all the earth" in 1 Kings 2:2, meaning "I am going to die".
The Way of All Flesh may also refer to:

Film and TV
 The Way of All Flesh (1927 film), 1927 lost film
 The Way of All Flesh (1940 film), a 1940 remake of the 1927 film
 The Way of All Flesh, 1997 documentary by Adam Curtis
 "The Way of All Flesh" (Superman: The Animated Series), a 1996 episode of Superman: The Animated Series

Other uses
 The Way of All Flesh (album), a 2008 album by Gojira
 Sherlock Holmes: The Way of All Flesh, a 2004 novella by Daniel Ward
 The Way of All Flesh, a rock climb at Barden's Lookout in the Blue Mountains, Australia
 The Way of All Flesh, a song from the English Metal band Kill II This